A sovereign is the supreme lawmaking authority within a particular jurisdiction.

Sovereign may also refer to:

Buildings
 Sovereign (building), a building in Burnaby, Canada
 The Sovereign (a.k.a. Sovereign Apartments), residential skyscraper on the Upper East Side in Manhattan, New York City, USA.

Literature
 Sovereign (Sansom novel), a 2006 novel by C. J. Sansom
 Sovereign (Dekker and Lee novel), a 2013 novel by Ted Dekker and Tosca Lee

Music
 Sovereign (EP), a 2000 EP and song by Neurosis
 Sovereign (album), a 2014 album by Michael W. Smith
 Sovereign, a 2007 album by Arashk
 Sovereign, a 2009 album by Tenet

Money
 Sovereign (English coin), minted from 1489 to 1604
 Sovereign (British coin), minted from 1817 to the present

Places
 Sovereign, Saskatchewan, a community in Canada
 Sovereign, West Virginia, a community in the United States

Ships
 Sovereign (1789 ship)
 Sovereign (1793 ship)
 Sovereign (1800 ship)
 Sovereign (yacht), the unsuccessful challenger of the 1964 America's Cup
 C.S. Sovereign, a DP2-type cable ship launched in 1991
 HMS Sovereign, a list of English warships or British Royal Navy ships
 MS Sovereign, a cruise ship of the Royal Caribbean line
 USS Sovereign, a list of United States Navy ships
 Sovereign-class cruise ship, a cruise ship class of Royal Caribbean
 List of ships named Sovereign

Fictional
 Sovereign Star Destroyer, a class of starship in Star Wars
 Sovereign, the class of the USS Enterprise (NCC-1701-E)

Television
 "Sovereign" (Sons of Anarchy), an episode of Sons of Anarchy
 The Sovereign, Hercules's evil alter-ego in Hercules: The Legendary Journeys
 Sovereign, a character on The Venture Bros.

Video games
 Sovereign (video game), a cancelled Sony Online Entertainment game
 Sovereign, a sentient starship in the Mass Effect series
 The Sovereign, a character in Rise of Incarnates

Other uses
 Sovereign (horse) (born 2016), Irish racehorse
 Cessna Citation Sovereign, a super mid-size business jet
 Sovereign Bank, a banking institution in the United States
 Sovereign Limited, an insurance company of New Zealand
 Sovereign Pontiff, a title for the Pope
 Sovereign wealth fund, a type of investment funds

See also 

 Fount of honour for honours and decorations
 Head of state
 Lady Sovereign (born 1985), MC and performing artist
 Monarch, the sovereign of a monarchy
 Royal Sovereign (disambiguation)
 Sovereign citizen movement
 Sovereign Hill, Victoria, Australia
 Sovereign of the Seas (disambiguation)
 Sovereignty
 Tribal sovereignty in the United States